The 2002 Liga Perdana 1 season is the fifth season of Liga Perdana 1. A total of 14 teams participated in the season.

The season kicked off on January 19, 2002. Perak dominated the season and ended up winning the title. Perak's Muhamad Khalid Jamlus was the season's top goalscorer with 17 goals.

A plus point was the surprisingly strong finish of club side Johor FC. At this time, the Football Association of Malaysia were trying to promote clubs as the future of Malaysian football.

Teams

A total of 14 teams will participate in the 2002 Liga Perdana 1 season.

 Penang FA (2001 Liga Perdana 1 champions)
 Terengganu FA
 Kelantan FA
 Selangor FA
 Pahang FA
 Perlis FA
 Perak FA
 Negeri Sembilan FA
 Sarawak FA
 Kuala Lumpur FA
 Malacca FA
 Johor FC (Promoted as 2001 Liga Perdana 2 champions)
 Sabah FA (Promoted as 2001 Liga Perdana 2 runner-up)
 NS Chempaka FC (Promoted as 2001 Liga Perdana 2 3rd-Place)

League table

Top goalscorers

Source: FIFA: Liga Perdana 1 Scorers''

Champions

References

External links
Details in rssf.com

Liga Perdana 1 seasons
1
Malaysia
Malaysia